Yu Jiao Li, known in the West as Iu-Kiao-Li: or, the Two Fair Cousins, is an early-Qing Chinese caizi jiaren (scholar and beauty) novel by Zhang Yun (張勻).

Yu Jiao Li is one of the best-known caizi jiaren novels, together with Ping Shan Leng Yan, and Haoqiu zhuan.  The English version published by Hunt and Clarke of London in 1827 is an adaptation of Jean-Pierre Abel-Rémusat's French translation.

Characters

Two characters, Zhang Guiru and Su Youde, plagiarize poems written by other people and pretend to be poets. Pseudo-caizi are foils to the real caizi in caizi jiaren stories.

Notes

External links

 Iu-kiao-li: or, the Two Fair Cousins Volume I (English version, derived from the French version)
  Iu-kiao-li: or, the Two Fair Cousins (French version, the basis of the English version)
 Also: at the Internet Archive, Volume III in French
17th-century Chinese novels
Qing dynasty novels
Chinese romance novels